Southeastern Institute of Technology (SIT), Huntsville, Alabama, was a  professional school from 1976 to 2004 providing continuing education and granting professional degrees focusing on application.

SIT was formed in 1976 as a private, not-for-profit, professional school under the provisions of Title 10 of the Code of Alabama. Its purpose was to provide professional-level continuing education and graduate degree programs in engineering, management, and applied science for career advancement, updating, and redirection.

SIT received 501(c)(3) status from the Internal Revenue Service, allowing gifts to the Institute to be tax deductible. SIT was Approved and Licensed by the Alabama Department of Education under Title 16-46-1 through 10, Code of Alabama, authorizing the Institute to conduct educational programs and to award degrees.

The school is now inactive, but can be reached electronically at SIT-Email@comcast.net or mail to P.O. Box 1485, Huntsville, AL.

Professional school
As a professional school, SIT differed from standard academic institutions in a number of important ways:
SIT was under the control of a Board of Directors representing the professional community.
SIT's faculty was composed exclusively of professional practitioners, teaching and advising on a part-time basis.
Application, rather than theory, was emphasized in all courses and programs.
SIT granted professional degrees, as contrasted with academic degrees.

Origin and History

The Huntsville metropolitan area has one of the highest concentrations of engineers and scientists in the United States, and is the home of hundreds of high-technology industrial and governmental organizations.

In the early 1970s, an ad hoc committee examined the special educational needs of this community. They concluded that although the two existing local universities – The University of Alabama in Huntsville and Alabama A&M University – had excellent academic programs, there was an urgent need for instruction at the advanced level and emphasizing applications.

Southeastern Institute of Technology was then planned as a stand-alone professional school, with the purpose of meeting the special needs of this high-technology community. The planners included individuals who had previously been involved in the graduate programs and continuing education then available in Huntsville, and understood the potential students as well as the shortcomings of the existing offerings. SIT opened in September 1976, and awarded its first master's degrees in August 1977.

Over the following two decades, the school was well received, serving several thousand students and awarding hundreds of degrees. In this same period, however, offerings of a similar nature slowly became available from the local state-supported schools.

By 2004, the SIT Board decided that the original purpose of the school was no longer valid and duplication of effort was not in the community's best interest. SIT was placed in an inactive status, not accepting new students or offering classroom courses. The school continues, however, as an entity, allowing the completion of degree requirements by the many students who were near the end of their master's and doctoral studies.

The following information concerns SIT when it was in full operation.

Characteristics

Southeastern Institute of Technology operated as a non-traditional institution in many aspects, but was highly traditional in others. The primary characteristics were as follows:
All courses were at an advanced level, emphasized the applied aspects of subjects, and expected appropriate backgrounds in mathematics and computer use.
Instruction was delivered in classroom environments or via Distance Learning.
The faculty was composed of highly qualified professional practitioners working in the subject areas.
Operations were designed to best accommodate non-traditional students (adults, part-time, and working).
Holding U.S. citizenship or a permanent residence status was required for students to be admitted to degree programs.
Regular admission to degree programs required practical experience (two years for a master's and five years for a doctorate).
Only professional degrees were awarded, and the degree requirements were comparable to those of the best of traditional schools.

Terms, Credits, and Grading

Instruction was given in eight-week periods, designated "Terms" (i.e., Early Fall Term, Winter Term, etc.). With six terms in a school year, only four weeks of off-time was available. Classes usually met twice weekly in the late afternoon or early evening, or on Saturdays. This schedule was designed to be optimum for part-time students, allowing good progress toward a degree while pursuing one course at a time.

Credit for course completion was expressed in "Units," the equivalent of Semester Hours. Most courses were available for 3 Units, and met for 40 class hours of 50 minutes each. Courses taken on a non-credit basis were awarded the standard Continuing Education Units (CEUs).

Grading was High Pass, Pass, Low Pass, and Unsatisfactory, earning 4, 3, 2, and 0 Quality Points respectively.

Degrees and Programs

Programs of study were available leading to the following professional degrees:
Master of Science (M.Sc.)
Master of Science in Engineering (M.Sc. Eng.)
Master of Science in Management (M.Sc. Mgt.)
Doctor of Science (D.Sc.)
Doctor of Engineering (D.Eng.)
Doctor of Management (D.Mgt.)
In some years, certain other degrees were available, mainly the Master of Business Administration (M.B.A.) and Doctor of Business Administration (D.B.A.).

Persons with considerable senior-level experience but who had not completed a college degree might be admitted to pursue a combined Bachelor's-Master's Program. In this, they were required to complete the equivalent of at least 120 semester hours credit plus the necessary credit for the master's degree. Upon program completion, a Bachelor of Science (B.Sc.) degree was awarded simultaneously with the master's degree.

Program specializations included the following areas: 
Radar and Signal Processing
Optics and Electro-Optics
Missile and Space Systems
Advanced Computers and Software
Intelligence Technologies and Management
Cost Estimating and Analysis
Contracts and Procurement Management
Science and Engineering Management.

Requirements for a master's degree included 30-36 Units credit with a 3.0 QPA; a master's project – an in-depth professional report – was included. For the doctoral degree, 48 Units of post-master's credit were required, including 27 Units at a 3.3 QPA in advanced coursework and 21 Units in research.

As previously noted, experience was required for regular admission to the graduate-degree programs; two years for master's degrees and five years for doctoral degrees. A candidate for the D.Eng. degree was also required to be a Registered Professional Engineer.

Facilities

The main facilities for SIT were in a commercial office building in the Cummings Research Park. These included the administrative offices, classrooms, a computer laboratory, and a library with some 10,000 volumes and hundreds of journal and magazine series. The Redstone Science Information Center, one of the largest technical libraries in the United States, was also available at nearby Redstone Arsenal.

The Center for Applied Research was a subsidiary of SIT. Adjacent to the main facility, this was used for contracted research.

SIT had a facility clearance and was eligible to conduct classified instruction and research. Classified courses, however, were conducted in government facilities.

During the 1980s, SIT had an instructional activity in South Africa. Also, support was given under a government subcontract to activities in Egypt.

Accreditation and recognition

There are two general types of educational accreditation: institutional and programmatic. In the United States, there is no governmental body responsible for either type of accreditation. Instead, there are membership associations for granting accreditation.

As a consequence of limitations described below, Southeastern Institute of Technology was neither accredited nor ever sought accreditation.

The Southern Association of Colleges and Schools (SACS) is the regional body for institutional accreditation of traditional academic schools. As an independent professional school with many non-traditional characteristics, Southeastern Institute of Technology was not eligible for SACS accreditation.

While there are national bodies providing institutional accreditation for non-traditional schools, their members are mainly for-profit schools and the accreditation has limited recognition.

The recognized body for programmatic accreditation in engineering and applied science (including computing) was the Accreditation Board for Engineering and Technology, now called ABET, Inc. This accreditation is essentially for undergraduate degree programs; also, ABET does not accredit programs from independent professional schools.

For programmatic accreditation in management, the primary cognizant body is the Association of Collegiate Business Schools and Programs (ACBSP). This accreditation is limited to schools that have full institutional accreditation.

The absence of accreditation was always clearly made known by SIT to potential students, as well as employing organizations. For employment purposes, accreditation is of less importance since a degree from an accredited school was required for regular admission to SIT.

In the absence of accreditation eligibility, the Alabama State Department of Education periodically made comprehensive assessments of SIT and its degree programs as part of the licensing procedures. While not constituting accreditation, their assessment of "approved" was close to the equivalent.

The acceptance of SIT as a provider of higher education is shown by all local government agencies and most regional industries in providing tuition assistance to attending students. Some government agencies occasionally sent students to SIT for full-time study.

Graduates of SIT are found in senior technical and managerial positions throughout the United States. Some are also found in instruction and research positions at educational institutions.

References

"Bulletin of Southeastern Institute of Technology," 1976 through 2004

Watson, Raymond C., Jr.; "An Outline of a Non-Traditional Graduate School for Engineers and Related Professionals," in Non-Traditional Graduate Education: A Frontier for the 1980's, James W. Fonseca, ed.; George Mason University, 1983

Private universities and colleges in Alabama
Universities and colleges in Huntsville, Alabama
Educational institutions established in 1976
Educational institutions disestablished in 2004
1976 establishments in Alabama
2004 disestablishments in Alabama